The Memorial to the 56 Signers of the Declaration of Independence is a memorial depicting the signatures of the 56 signatories to the United States Declaration of Independence.  It is located in the Constitution Gardens on the National Mall in Washington, D.C. The memorial is accessible to the public by crossing a wooden bridge onto a small island set in the lake between Constitution Avenue and the Reflecting Pool, not far from the Vietnam Veterans Memorial.

History 
Public Law 95-260 was passed by Congress in 1978 to create a memorial to the signers of the Declaration of Independence. The memorial is a gift from the American Revolution Bicentennial Administration and consists of 56 stone blocks, each with a facsimile of the signer's actual signature, his occupation, and his home town.  It was dedicated on July 4, 1984, exactly 208 years after the Congress voted to approve the Declaration of Independence.

Memorialized signers
Fifty-six delegates to the Second Continental Congress signed the Declaration of Independence and are honored at this Memorial:

President of Congress
1.  John Hancock (Massachusetts)

New Hampshire
2.  Josiah Bartlett
3.  William Whipple
4.  Matthew Thornton

Massachusetts
5.  Samuel Adams
6.  John Adams
7.  Robert Treat Paine
8.  Elbridge Gerry

Rhode Island
9.  Stephen Hopkins
10.  William Ellery

Connecticut
11.  Roger Sherman
12.  Samuel Huntington
13.  William Williams
14.  Oliver Wolcott

New York
15.  William Floyd
16.  Philip Livingston
17.  Francis Lewis
18.  Lewis Morris

New Jersey
19.  Richard Stockton
20.  John Witherspoon
21.  Francis Hopkinson
22.  John Hart
23.  Abraham Clark

Pennsylvania
24.  Robert Morris
25.  Benjamin Rush
26.  Benjamin Franklin
27.  John Morton
28.  George Clymer
29.  James Smith
30.  George Taylor
31.  James Wilson
32.  George Ross

Delaware
33.  George Read
34.  Caesar Rodney
35.  Thomas McKean

Maryland
36.  Samuel Chase
37.  William Paca
38.  Thomas Stone
39.  Charles Carroll of Carrollton

Virginia
40.  George Wythe
41.  Richard Henry Lee
42.  Thomas Jefferson
43.  Benjamin Harrison
44.  Thomas Nelson, Jr.
45.  Francis Lightfoot Lee
46.  Carter Braxton

North Carolina
47.  William Hooper
48.  Joseph Hewes
49.  John Penn

South Carolina
50.  Edward Rutledge
51.  Thomas Heyward, Jr.
52.  Thomas Lynch, Jr.
53.  Arthur Middleton

Georgia
54.  Button Gwinnett
55.  Lyman Hall
56.  George Walton

See also

 Charles Thomson, Secretary of the Continental Congress
 John Rogers, Maryland delegate who voted for the Declaration but left Philadelphia before the signing.
 Henry Wisner, New York delegate who voted for the Declaration but left Philadelphia before the signing.
 Founding Fathers of the United States
 Physical history of the United States Declaration of Independence
 Independence Hall
 Syng inkstand
 List of public art in Washington, D.C., Ward 2
 Adams Memorial (proposed)
 Benjamin Franklin National Memorial
 Jefferson Memorial
 Signers Monument
 Washington Monument
 Architecture of Washington, D.C.

References 

 Memorial to the 56 Signers of the Declaration of Independence – Constitution Gardens – National Capital Planning Commission

External links 

 

1978 establishments in Washington, D.C.
Cultural infrastructure completed in 1984
Monuments and memorials in Washington, D.C.
Monuments and memorials on the National Register of Historic Places in Washington, D.C.
National Mall
National Mall and Memorial Parks
United States Declaration of Independence
Monuments and memorials to Thomas Jefferson
Benjamin Franklin
John Adams
United States Declaration of Independence in art
United States Bicentennial
Monuments and memorials to United States Founding Fathers